Spiral is a studio album by the Greek electronic composer Vangelis, released in December 1977. It was the third album produced by Vangelis in Nemo Studios, London, which was his creative base until the late 1980s. For the track "To the Unknown Man" Vangelis received the Midem International Instrumental award in 1978.

Overview
It is a concept album, thematically inspired by ancient Tao philosophy, exploring the nature of the universe moving in spirals. On the front cover is cited Tao Te Ching: "Going on means going far - Going far means returning", while the sleeve notes state that the track "Dervish D" is "inspired by the Dervish dancer who by his whirling realises the spiralling of the universe".

It was a less known and acclaimed album than the two which preceded in the 1970s, Heaven and Hell (1975) and Albedo 0.39 (1976).

Release
The album reached #38 on the Dutch album charts in 1978.

In 2011, the album was included, along with Heaven and Hell and Albedo 0.39, in a 3-CD box set series "Original Album Classics" by Sony, RCA and Legacy Recordings. In 2013, the album was released in a remastered and reissued digipak edition by Esoteric Recordings. It includes a bonus track, previously never issued on CD, "To the Unknown Man (II)", which was released as a B-side of the single "To the Unknown Man" in 1977.

Instrumentation
The album is entirely instrumental, apart from Vangelis' processed vocals on "Ballad". Vangelis plays synthesizer, sequencers, electric piano, electronic organ, harmonica, brass, timpani, percussion. It is the first album on which Vangelis used the Yamaha CS-80 synthesizer, on which he would come to rely heavily in subsequent work, and is the most sequencer-based album of his career.

Reception

Mike DeGagne of AllMusic noted that the album lacks the "atmospheric" from the previous two albums. He goes on to say that "although the structures and the overall dynamics of the pieces are less complicated and less sophisticated, Spirals keyboard utilization is still extremely effectual", and "musical movement does seem to transgress toward full, complete soundscapes", especially in "To the Unknown Man". Henri Stirk from Background Magazine rated the 2013 edition by Esoteric Recordings 4/5 stars.

Track listing
All songs composed and arranged by Vangelis.

Personnel
Vangelis — synthesizers, keyboards and other instruments

Production
Vangelis — producer, arranger, design
Keith Spencer-Allen — engineer
Marlis Duncklau — assistant Engineer
Michael Hudson — graphic design
Jack Wood — art direction
Michael Plomer, Veronique Skawinska — photography

Appearances in other media 
 "To The Unknown Man" was used in the 1977 Royal Air Force Careers Information film "12 Sqn" along with other clips from the Spiral album, showing 12 Sqn Buccaneers partaking in NATO Exercise Opengate off Gibraltar.
 "To The Unknown Man" was used in the BBC coverage of the 1979 World Snooker Championship at the Crucible Theatre, in Sheffield.

References 

1977 albums
Vangelis albums
RCA Records albums